This is a list of seasons completed by the Austin Wranglers. The Wranglers were a professional arena football franchise of arenafootball2 (AF2), based in Austin, Texas. The team was established in 2004 as a member of the Arena Football League (AFL). The Wranglers made the playoffs twice, once while in the AFL, and once in what would be their only AF2 season. However, the team did not win a playoff game in either year. Prior to the 2009 season, the Wranglers announced that they would cease operations. The team played its home games at Frank Erwin Center.

All seasons

References
 

Arena Football League seasons by team
Austin Wranglers seasons
Texas sports-related lists
Austin Wranglers seasons